The 1970 United Kingdom general election in Northern Ireland was held on 31 March with 12 MPs elected in single-seat constituencies using first-past-the-post as part of the wider general election in the United Kingdom. It was the first general election held after the Representation of the People Act 1969 which reduced the voting age from 21 to 18.

Results
The Ulster Unionists lost seats to the Protestant Unionist Party led by Ian Paisley, moderator of the Free Presbyterian Church of Ulster, and to Unity, a nationalist organisation which had won a by-election in 1969.

In the election as a whole, the Labour Party failed to return to government and the Conservative Party, which included the Ulster Unionists, formed a government led by Edward Heath as Prime Minister. This was the last parliament where the UUP took the Conservative whip in the House of Commons, breaking with them after the Parliament of Northern Ireland was suspended by the Northern Ireland (Temporary Provisions) Act 1972.

MPs elected

Footnotes

References

Northern Ireland
1970
1970 elections in Northern Ireland